Multibody simulation (MBS) is a method of numerical simulation in which multibody systems are composed of various rigid or elastic bodies. Connections between the bodies can be modeled with kinematic constraints (such as joints) or force elements (such as spring dampers). Unilateral constraints and Coulomb-friction can also be used to model frictional contacts between bodies.
Multibody simulation is a useful tool for conducting motion analysis. It is often used during product development to evaluate characteristics of comfort, safety, and performance.  For example, multibody simulation has been widely used since the 1990s as a component of automotive suspension design.  It can also be used to study issues of biomechanics, with applications including sports medicine, osteopathy, and human-machine interaction.

The heart of any multibody simulation software program is the solver. The solver is a set of computation algorithms that solve equations of motion. Types of components that can be studied through multibody simulation range from electronic control systems to noise, vibration and harshness.  Complex models such as engines are composed of individually designed components, e.g. pistons/crankshafts.

The MBS process often can be divided in 5 main activities. The first activity of the MBS process chain is the” 3D CAD master model”, in which product developers, designers and engineers are using the CAD system to generate a CAD model and its assembly structure related to given specifications. This 3D CAD master model is converted during the activity “Data transfer” to the MBS input data formats i.e. STEP. The “MBS Modeling” is the most complex activity in the process chain. Following rules and experiences, the 3D model in MBS format, multiple boundaries, kinematics, forces, moments or degrees of freedom are used as input to generate the MBS model. Engineers have to use MBS software and their knowledge and skills in the field of engineering mechanics and machine dynamics to build the MBS model including joints and links. The generated MBS model is used during the next activity “Simulation”. Simulations, which are specified by time increments and boundaries like starting conditions are run by MBS Software i.e. Siemens Simcenter 3D Motion, NX Motion, MSC ADAMS or RecurDyn. It is also possible to perform MBS simulations using free and open source packages such as  MBDyn, with CAD packages such as NX CAD, FreeCAD as pre-post processors, to prepare CAD models and visualize results.  The last activity is the “Analysis and evaluation”. Engineers use case-dependent directives to analyze and evaluate moving paths, speeds, accelerations, forces or moments. The results are used to enable releases or to improve the MBS model, in case the results are insufficient. One of the most important benefits of the MBS process chain is the usability of the results to optimize the 3D CAD master model components. Due to the fact that the process chain enables the optimization of component design, the resulting loops can be used to achieve a high level of design and MBS model optimization in an iterative process.

See also 
 Siemens Simcenter 3D Motion
 Siemens NX Motion
 MSC Adams

References 

computational physics
Dynamical systems